The 1963–64 season was Real Madrid Club de Fútbol's 61st season in existence and the club's 32nd consecutive season in the top flight of Spanish football.

Summary
Miguel Muñoz continued refreshing the squad, which he started last season, with Araquistáin as goalkeeper, Pachín, Zoco in defense, and forwards Serena and Grosso playing along Amancio as the beginning of a new era in the club.

The team clinched its tenth League title, the fourth in a row. In the European Cup, the squad reached the Final against Helenio Herrera's Inter losing the trophy by a 1–3 defeat. The Final was the last official match for Alfredo Di Stéfano for the club due to chairman Santiago Bernabéu chose not to renew his contract and disagreements with head coach Miguel Muñoz over marking Inter' star Giacinto Facchetti. On 24 June 1964 the club broadcast an official statement with Di Stefano out of Real Madrid after 11 seasons, during which he won 8 League titles and 5 European Cups.

In the Copa del Generalísimo, the club reached Quarterfinals where it was defeated by Atlético Madrid in a tie-breaker match following a 3–3 aggregate draw.

Squad

Transfers

Competitions

La Liga

League table

Results by round

Matches

Copa del Generalísimo

Round of 32

Eightfinals

Quarter-finals

European Cup

Preliminary round

Eightfinals

Quarter-finals

Semi-finals

Final

Statistics

Squad statistics

Players statistics

References

Notes

External links
 BDFútbol

Real Madrid CF seasons
Spanish football championship-winning seasons
Real Madrid